Aletheia University (after Greek ἀλήθεια, 'truth') is a private university in Tamsui, New Taipei City and Madou, Tainan in Taiwan. It was founded by George Leslie Mackay as Oxford College. It has close links to the Presbyterian Church in Taiwan, and is one of the oldest institutions of higher education in Taiwan.

History

In 1872, Dr. George Leslie Mackay, a missionary from the Presbyterian Church in Canada, designed and supervised the construction of the original school building. He named it "Oxford College" as a gesture of thanks to the residents of Oxford County in Ontario, Canada, who had made financial donations. It was completed in 1882. The curriculum included courses in theology, Bible studies, sociology, logic, classical Chinese literature, Chinese history, natural sciences, and basic medicine, anatomy, and clinical practices. Oxford College was an early example of western-style institution and general education in Taiwan.

The Northern Synod of the Presbyterian Church in Taiwan was the founder of the later university, which the group planned in 1959 to establish at the location of Oxford College. In August 1965, the Ministry of Education gave approval for the Tamsui Institute of Industrial & Business Administration. In April 1971, its name was changed to Tamsui Oxford College.

In 1991, 18.8 hectares of land was purchased to create a branch school in Matou, Tainan county. The school received permission to become a four-year college called the Tamsui Oxford University College in August 1994. The Matou branch began accepting students, with an emphasis on two-year technical education, in February 1997.

In August 1999, the school was renamed Aletheia University, after the Greek word for truth. As of 2023, the university has 22 departments and offers nine vocational Bachelor's programs and eight Master's programs. They are organized into five colleges including Humanities, Finance and Economics, Management, "Tourism, Leisure, and Sports", and Information Sciences and Business Intelligence.

Notable alumni
 Emerson Tsai, actor, television host and singer
 Queenie Tai, actress

See also
 List of universities in Taiwan
Taiwan Seminary

References

External links

 

1999 establishments in Taiwan
Educational institutions established in 1999
Association of Christian Universities and Colleges in Asia
Private universities and colleges in Taiwan
Universities and colleges in New Taipei
Presbyterianism in Taiwan
National monuments of Taiwan
Universities and colleges in Taiwan
Comprehensive universities in Taiwan